Girl Crazy was a 1929 comedy film directed by Mack Sennett and starring Andy Clyde as "a girl-crazy sexagenarian". The film's story is credited to Hampton Del Ruth, Alfred J. Goulding, Harry McCoy, Earle Rodney, and Mack Sennett.

Plot summary

Cast
 Andy Clyde as a Girl Crazy Sexagenarian
 Alma Bennett as Beatrice McCoy
 Vernon Dent as Elmer Salter
 Irving Bacon as Grandpa Salter

References

External links
 

1929 films
1920s English-language films
1929 comedy films
Mack Sennett Comedies short films
American black-and-white films
Films directed by Mack Sennett
American comedy short films
1920s American films